Augustus V. Long (May 14, 1877 – May 20, 1955) was a United States district judge of the United States District Court for the Northern District of Florida.

Education and career

Born in Lake City, Florida, Long attended Florida Agricultural College (now the University of Florida), and read law to enter the bar in 1898. He was a United States Army Lieutenant during the Spanish–American War. He was in private practice in Starke, Florida from 1898 to 1910. He was a member of the Florida House of Representatives in 1903. He was a State's Attorney of Florida in 1907. He was State's Attorney for the Eighth Judicial Circuit of Florida from 1910 to 1921. He was a Judge of the Circuit Court of Appeals for the Eighth Judicial Circuit of Florida from 1921 to 1934.

Federal judicial service

On May 26, 1934, Long was nominated by President Franklin D. Roosevelt to a seat on the United States District Court for the Northern District of Florida vacated by Judge William Bostwick Sheppard. Long was confirmed by the United States Senate on May 29, 1934, and received his commission on June 4, 1934. He assumed senior status on October 1, 1947. Long served in that capacity until his death on May 20, 1955.

References

Sources
 

1877 births
1955 deaths
Judges of the United States District Court for the Northern District of Florida
United States district court judges appointed by Franklin D. Roosevelt
20th-century American judges
United States Army officers
People from Lake City, Florida
People from Starke, Florida
United States federal judges admitted to the practice of law by reading law